Kenthurst is a suburb of Sydney, in the state of New South Wales, Australia 39 kilometres north-west of the Sydney central business district in the local government area of The Hills Shire. It is part of the Hills District region.

Features of the suburb include a large park (Kenthurst Park), a shopping village and park complex, numerous schools, two petrol stations, a function centre, a rural fire service station and a public swimming pool. Home of the Kenthurst “Bush Boys” Soccer Club.

History
The original inhabitants of the Dural area were the Darug people.

Kenthurst is derived from the English County of Kent and hurst meaning a woody hillock or clearing.

The area was originally known as Little Dooral and later Little Dural. In 1886 a public meeting was held to discuss a change of name. Charles Gibb was the main agitator who declared that the settlement needed a more elegant title. "Kent Forest" was suggested as an appropriate name for the area where settlers from Kent County that had settled in the area, but it wasn't popular and eventually Kenthurst was chosen. The meeting applied to the government ministry for permission to change the name, which was successful and was in general use from 1887.

In the 1890s, Dural and the Hills district was the chief supplier of citrus fruit for most of Australia. Poultry and vegetable farms also flourished.

Kenthurst Post Office opened on 1 August 1887.

Shopping complex
The Kenthurst shopping complex features a post office, supermarket, butcher, bottle shop, hairdresser and other shops. Outside the village centre there are several preschools and a second real estate agent. There are numerous local businesses in the area such as timber yards, florist, wholesalers, earthmovers and other similar businesses.

Village green
The village green is situated across Nelson St from the shopping village. It features a public swimming pool, a basketball/netball court, barbecue facilities, a playground, park benches and a large grassed area. The village green is maintained by Kenthurst Rotary

Schools
Schools within Kenthurst include:
 Kenthurst Public School (public, primary)
 St Madeleine's (Catholic Systemic, primary)
 Marian College (Catholic Systemic, secondary)
 The Hills Grammar School (private, K-12)
 Kenthurst Preschool (community-based, not-for-profit)

Sport and recreation
Kenthurst has its own cricket club, soccer club, netball club and village green maintained by Kenthurst Rotary.

Demographics 
At the 2016 census, the suburb of Kenthurst recorded a population of 5,037 residents.  Of these: 
 Age distribution  The distribution of ages in Kenthurst was fairly similar to the country as a whole.  Kenthurst residents' median age was 42 years, compared to the national median of 38. Children aged under 15 years made up 19.4% of the population (national average was 18.7%) and people aged 65 years and over made up 17.9% of the population (national average was 15.8%).
 Ethnic diversity  78.0% of people were born in Australia. The next most common country of birth was England at 4.2%.  52.4% of people had both parents born in Australia. 84.5% of people spoke only English at home. Other languages spoken at home included Italian at 2.3%
 Religion  The most common responses for religion were Catholic 37.1%, Anglican 19.7% and No Religion 18.9%.
 Finances  The median weekly household income was $2,604, compared to  the national median of $1,234.  Real estate values were correspondingly high: the median mortgage repayments were $3,000 compared to the national median of $1,438.
 Housing  Most (89.1%) private dwellings were family households and 10.0% were single-person households.  Stand-alone houses accounted for 95.2% of dwellings. The average household size was 3.4 people.

Agriculture
The suburb is home to a large number of whole-sale nurseries.

Notable residents
 Don Burke (born 1947), television personality
 Andrew Leeds (born 1965), Australian rugby player
 James Millar (born 1980), theatre actor and writer
 Greg Page (born 1972), singer, musician and actor

References

Suburbs of Sydney
The Hills Shire